Ryngold or Ringaudas was a mythological Grand Duke of Lithuania from the Palemonids legends and supposed father of Mindaugas, the first King of Lithuania (1251–1263). In fact, there is nothing known about Mindaugas' father from reliable sources. The Livonian Rhymed Chronicle, a contemporary source, just mentions that he was a powerful duke, but does not provide his name.

Ryngold, son of otherwise unknown Algimantas, is first mentioned in the second redaction of the Lithuanian Chronicle written c. 1515 and has no historical basis. In the chronicle Ryngold returned to Navahrudak after a victorious battle with the Mongols on the bank of the Neman River at Mohilna near Minsk. This battle could have some historical basis as Mongols did invade Lithuania, but it happened in the late 1230s and early 1240s. However, it is known for a fact that at the time Mindaugas already had supreme power in Lithuania. The legendary account claimed that Ryngold fathered three sons. He left Navharudak to one of his sons, Vaišvilkas. However, it is known from reliable contemporary sources that Vaišvilkas was son of Mindaugas. Therefore the third redaction of the Lithuanian Chronicle, also known as the Bychowiec Chronicle, made Ryngold father of Mindaugas to correct this clear contradiction. This legendary version was popularized by Maciej Stryjkowski and other medieval historians, and it still survives to this day.

See also
 Palemonids – the legendary dynasty of Ryngold
 House of Mindaugas – historical family tree of Mindaugas
 List of early Lithuanian dukes

References

13th-century Lithuanian nobility
Legendary monarchs